The Strømsveien tram fire (Trikkebrannen i Strømsveien) was a railway accident  resulting from a fire erupting in an Oslo Tramway car traveling on Strømsveien street  in Oslo, Norway.

On 2 August 1958, a set of two cars, 194 and 198, of the Gullfisk type was traveling the Lilleaker Line ( Lilleakerbanenen) – Østensjø Line (Østensjøbanen)  route from Bøler to Jar. This connection was opened in 1937 and the Gullfisk cars introduced in 1939. 

As the tram braked as it approached Totengata a technical malfunction caused arcing and a fire erupted in the front of car 198 which was the latter car. The exit door, being operated by the tram driver who was seated in the lead car, remained closed for a few, critical seconds as passengers were struck by panic. The disaster claimed the lives of five people; seventeen were injured. Following the disaster, fire extinguishers, better emergency exits and emergency door openers became mandatory in all public transport.

References

59°54'32.7"N 10°47'17.6"E

Railway accidents and incidents in Norway
Fires in Norway
Train and rapid transit fires
Railway accidents in 1958
1958 in Norway
1958 fires in Europe
Tram accidents
August 1958 events in Europe